Supertone may refer to:

 Supertone Records
 The Supertones Band, a West Indian band
 Supertones, a Christian ska band
 A guitar developed by Charles Brasher